Raising Asia is an American reality television series that debuted on Lifetime on July 29, 2014. This series is a spin-off of Dance Moms. It follows the daily life of Asia Monet Ray, a then eight-year-old dancer, and her family. The show focuses mainly on Asia's career as a dancer and the repercussions fame can have on a family.

Synopsis 

Raising Asia features Asia Monet Ray and follows both her singing and dancing career. This show also brings to light many of the other activities and performances Asia participates in. The series captures the day-to-day life of the Ray family and how they raise an eight-year-old celebrity. The series aired on Lifetime.

Cast 
 Asia Monet Ray is a dancer, singer, student, actress, and gymnast. She has appeared on the shows Dance Moms and Abby's Ultimate Dance Competition.
 Kristie Ray, a former fitness model is Asia's mother. She has appeared on the shows Dance Moms and Abby's Ultimate Dance Competition alongside her daughter.
 Shawn Ray, a Hall of Fame Bodybuilder, is Asia's father.
 Bella Blu Ray is Asia's younger sister. She herself is a dancer and a gymnast.
 Anthony Burrell is Asia's main choreographer.
 Billy Hufsey is Asia's manager.
 Gina Alvarado-Samperio is Asia's aunt and Kristie's sister.

Episodes

Season 1 (2014)

References

External links 
 

Lifetime (TV network) original programming
2010s American reality television series
2014 American television series debuts
2014 American television series endings